"" is the national anthem of the Syrian Arab Republic, with lyrics written by Khalil Mardam Bey and the music by Mohammed Flayfel, who also composed the national anthem of the Iraq as well as many other Arab folk songs.

History
It was adopted in 1938 after a national competition was held by Hashim al-Atassi's nationalist government to choose a state anthem for the new republic two years after the Franco–Syrian Treaty of Independence was signed which gave Syria limited autonomy and future independence. The anthem was initially set to lose the competition, but it later won the competition after it gained rapid popularity amongst the Syrian populace which put pressure on the competition's committee to reconsider its decisions, and eventually the anthem won and was adopted by the government as Syria's national anthem.

It temporarily fell from use when Syria joined the United Arab Republic (UAR) with Egypt in 1958. It was decided that the national anthem of the UAR would be a combination of the then-Egyptian national anthem and "". When Syria seceded from the union in 1961, "Humat ad-Diyar" was completely restored and has been used ever since despite the anthem's usage being disputed between the ruling Ba'ath government and the opposition prior to the start of the civil war in 2011.

Structure

The Syrian national anthem is divided into four quatrain stanzas, each containing four lines. The rhyme scheme used is an Arabic form called "Ruba'i", where each stanza has the same final rhyme in its component lines, giving the following rhyme scheme in the anthem: AAAA, BBBB, CCCC, DDDD. All of the lines in the state anthem consist each of 11 syllables, all of which have the same system of scansion, which is as follows: \ / ˘ \ / ˘ \ / ˘ \ /  where \ is an intermediate stress, / is a strong stress, and ˘ is unstressed. Although, for simplicity, an alternative stress scheme is offered that does not recognize intermediate stresses, and that scheme is: / / ˘ / / ˘ / / ˘ / /. In either case, there are 11 syllables per line, and the ruba'i rhyme scheme.

Lyrics
The Syrian national anthem is divided into four stanzas, each pertaining to a different and unique aspect of Syria from the remaining stanzas. Although the name of the anthem is "Guardians of the Homeland", which is a metaphor for the Syrian military, only the first stanza in fact talks about said army. The stanza breakdown is as follows: The first stanza is about Syria's army, and its role in defending the nation and in defending the citizens' integrity and Arabness. The second stanza is about Syria's scenery and terrain, where it talks about Syria's plains, mountains, and sunlit skies. The third stanza is about Syria's people, their hopes, martyrs, and flag. The fourth stanza talks about Syria's history, from its past and present to its future.

Arabic original

Syriac lyrics

English translations

See also
"Mawtini", the national anthem of Iraq, also composed by Mohammed Flayfel

Notes

References

External links
 Lyrics, sheet music, and Audio

Asian anthems
Syrian music
National symbols of Syria
1936 songs
National anthem compositions in A-flat major